Nabi Bakhshwala  is a village in Kapurthala district of Punjab State, India. The village is administrated by a Sarpanch, who is an elected representative.

Demography 
According to the report published by Census India in 2011, Nabi Bakhshwala has 2 houses with the total population of 18 persons of which 10 are male and 8 females. Literacy rate of  Nabi Bakhshwala is 46.15%, lower than the state average of 75.84%.  The population of children in the age group 0–6 years is 5 which is 27.78% of the total population.  Child sex ratio is approximately 1500, higher than the state average of 846.

Population data

Nearby villages  
 Mand Dhaliwal
 Gurmukh Singhwala
 Tukra No 3
 Mand Bhandal Bet
 Bana Malwala
 Kishan Singhwala
 Tarkhanawali
 Sheikhanwala
 Alipur
 Sangojla
 Talwandi Rajputan

References

External links
  Villages in Kapurthala
 Kapurthala Villages List

Villages in Kapurthala district